Scoliosia is a monotypic moth genus in the subfamily Arctiinae erected by George Hampson in 1914. Its single species, Scoliosia brunnescens, was first described by Walter Rothschild in 1912. It is found in Papua and Papua New Guinea.

References

Lithosiina
Monotypic moth genera
Moths of New Guinea